Sri Lanka competed at the 2014 Summer Youth Olympics, in Nanjing, China from 16 August to 28 August 2014. The Sri Lankan team consisted of nine athletes in six sports.

Medalists
Medals awarded to participants of mixed-NOC (Combined) teams are represented in italics. These medals are not counted towards the individual NOC medal tally.

Athletics

Sri Lanka qualified one male athlete in the Youth Olympic Trials held in Bangkok, Thailand from May 21–22, 2014.

Qualification Legend: Q=Final A (medal); qB=Final B (non-medal); qC=Final C (non-medal); qD=Final D (non-medal); qE=Final E (non-medal)

Boys
Track & road events

Badminton

Sri Lanka qualified one maleathlete based on the 2 May 2014 BWF Junior World Rankings. Later Sri Lanka was given a female quota to compete by the tripartite committee.

Singles

Doubles

Beach Volleyball

Sri Lanka qualified a boys' team by their performance at the AVC Qualification Tournament.

Rowing

Sri Lanka was given a boat to compete by the tripartite committee.

Qualification Legend: FA=Final A (medal); FB=Final B (non-medal); FC=Final C (non-medal); FD=Final D (non-medal); SA/B=Semifinals A/B; SC/D=Semifinals C/D; R=Repechage

Swimming

Sri Lanka qualified two swimmers. In the five races the two swimmers competed in, all five produced new national records.

Boys

Girls

Tennis

Sri Lanka was given a quota to compete by the tripartite committee.

Singles

Doubles

References

Nations at the 2014 Summer Youth Olympics
2014 in Sri Lankan sport
Sri Lanka at the Youth Olympics